William St Lawrence W. Collier (born 5 May 1991) is an English rugby union player who plays as a tighthead prop for Harlequins in the Gallagher Premiership.

Collier is a front row specialist who cites his interest in the 'dark arts' (of scrummaging) inspired in part by Chris Ritchie, a veteran London Welsh player and Joe Launchbury, a current England Rugby international.

His first club was Rosslyn Park F.C., beginning at just 6 years old and playing in their mini, youth and First XV squads. Harlequins brought him into their academy in 2011. Since his first senior cap in 2012, Collier has featured regularly for the Harlequins senior squad in the Premiership. He scored his debut try for Harlequins in a European Rugby Champions Cup defeat to La Rochelle in the pool stage of the 2017–18 season. In the 2020–21 Premiership Rugby season, Collier was a replacement in both the Premiership semi-final victory over Bristol Bears and the final against Exeter Chiefs on 26 June 2021, as Harlequins won the game 40–38 in the highest scoring Premiership final ever.

He made his England Test debut against Argentina on 10 June 2017 and made a second appearance a week later in the deciding match, scoring a try. England won the Argentina tour, June 2017; two test matches to nil.

International career

International tries

References

External links
Harlequins Profile
England Profile

1991 births
Living people
England international rugby union players
English rugby union players
Harlequin F.C. players
Rugby union players from Hammersmith
Rugby union props